Storm Boy is a 1976 Australian drama film based on the 1964 book of the same name by Colin Thiele, about a lonely boy and his pet pelicans living in a coastal wilderness with his reclusive father. It was the third feature film made by the South Australian Film Corporation, and is a highlight of the New Wave of Australian Cinema from the 1970s. The film was financed by SAFC, Seven Network and the Australian Film Commission.

Plot
Mike (Greg Rowe) is a lonely young boy wandering through the fierce deserted coast of South Australia's Coorong, near the mouth of the Murray River. He and his reclusive father 'Hide Away' Tom (Peter Cummins) live in the isolated sand dunes facing the Southern Ocean. In search of friendship, Mike encounters another recluse in the wilderness, Fingerbone Bill (David Gulpilil), an Aboriginal man estranged from his tribal people. Fingerbone names Mike "Storm Boy" and enlists the child's help caring for three orphaned pelican chicks.

Eventually, Mike's Dad insists that he release the grown birds back into the wild. However one particular pelican, named 'Mr Percival' by Mike, returns. The bird forms a deep bond with the boy until sadly, Mr Percival is shot by duck shooters. With the wise guidance of Fingerbone Bill, Mike learns of the cycle of life and is eventually allowed by his father to attend school for the first time in a nearby village.

Cast

Production
Colin Thiele had little involvement in the scripting of the film. His only requirement was that his novel was not turned into a sex comedy. The budget came from the South Australian Film Corporation, the Australian Film Commission and the Seven television network.

Shooting began in May 1976, with exteriors shot near Goolwa and interiors in the SAFC's studio at Norwood. Eleven-year-old Greg Rowe was an untrained actor, selected from over 70 applicants. Three pelicans played the lead pelican. In 2009 Mr Percival died at Royal Adelaide Zoo, aged 33 years old.

The production team later reunited on Blue Fin (1978).

Reception
Storm Boy was a hit, grossing $2,645,000 at the box office in Australia, which is equivalent to $13,674,650 in 2009 dollars.

Awards
It was a popular children's film both in Australia and Britain and won a medal at the Moscow Film Festival in 1977 for best children's film.

Remake

In 2016, the 40th anniversary of the original film adaptation, Screen Australia announced support for a remake of the 1976 film. Australia's National Film and Sound Archive also placed on limited releasing a digital re-mastering of the original 1976 film, for use at film festivals.

The new Storm Boy film, produced by Michael Boughen and Matthew Street, has a screenplay written by Justin Monjo and is directed by Shawn Seet. The cast includes Geoffrey Rush, Finn Little, Jai Courtney and Erik Thomson.

See also
 Cinema of Australia
 South Australian Film Corporation
 Mr Percival

References

External links

Storm Boy at the National Film and Sound Archive
Storm Boy at Oz Movies
Murdoch University reading Room
Australian Film Commission
Oz Reading School Activities for Senior
Storm Boy at Australian Screen Online
Storm Boy at Box Office Prophets
Storm Boy at film.org.au: the best of Australian Films

1976 films
1976 drama films
Australian children's drama films
Films about birds
Films based on Australian novels
Films based on children's books
Films directed by Henri Safran
Films set in South Australia
Films set on beaches
1970s children's films
Films about Aboriginal Australians
1970s English-language films